Karandi (sometimes spelled as Krandi) is a village in Sardulgarh tehsil of Mansa district in Punjab, India. The last village of the tehsil, is located at the border of Punjab and Haryana states.
Pind da sarpanch- Ajit Sharma

Geography 

It is located at the border of Punjab and Haryana states at only 8 km from Sardulgarh. Khaira Khurd, Nahran and Sangha are the surrounding villages on Punjab side.

Education 

The village has good educational sources with a Punjabi University Neighbourhood Campus and a government senior secondary school.

See also 
Sardulgarh

References 

Villages in Mansa district, India